Abbasabad (also Romanized as ‘Abbāsābād; also known as ‘Abbāsābād-e Qūrī) is a village in Bakesh-e Yek Rural District, in the Central District of Mamasani County, Fars Province, Iran. At the 2006 census, its population was 132, in 34 families.

References 

Populated places in Mamasani County